Eddie Bond (July 1, 1933 – March 20, 2013) was an American singer and guitarist who was active in country music and rockabilly.

Biography
In the mid-1950s, Bond recorded for Mercury Records and toured with Elvis Presley, Carl Perkins, Jerry Lee Lewis, Johnny Cash, Roy Orbison, Warren Smith and others. He is infamous for having rejected the then 18-year-old Elvis Presley, who was auditioning for Bond's band. It was shortly thereafter that Presley recorded his first single at Sun Records.

Bond's contribution to the genre has been recognized by the Rockabilly Hall of Fame.

He died of Alzheimer's disease in 2013.

Discography

Albums
 1982  - Rocking Daddy from Memphis Tennessee (Rockhouse)
 1984  - Rocking Daddy from Memphis Tennessee Volume 2 (Rockhouse)

References

External links
Listing of all Eddie Bond's songs and alternatives

1933 births
2013 deaths
American country singers
American rockabilly musicians
American rockabilly guitarists
American male guitarists
Sun Records artists
D Records artists
Ekko Records artists
Musicians from Memphis, Tennessee
Deaths from dementia in Tennessee
Deaths from Alzheimer's disease
Guitarists from Tennessee
20th-century American guitarists
Country musicians from Tennessee
20th-century American male musicians